The Torneio Centro-Sul, was a football competition held during the years of 1968 and 1969, reuniting clubs of the part south of Brazil as a qualifier for the Torneio dos Campeões da CBD, likewise Torneio Norte-Nordeste. The tournament had only two editions, but ended up being abandoned due to lack of interest from clubs and the discontinuity of the Torneio dos Campeões.

List of Champions

1968 Torneio Centro Sul

Participants

Group 1 (Central)

The final match not played as Villa Nova had secured the classification beforehand

Group 2 (Central)

Group 1 (South)

Group 2 (South)

The final match not played as Santa Cruz had secured the classification beforehand

Knockout stage

Champions

1969 Torneio Centro Sul

Participants

NoteThe second edition of the tournament as disbanded after 6 rounds played.

See also 

Torneio dos Campeões da CBD
Torneio Norte-Nordeste
Copa Sul-Minas
Copa Verde

References  

Recurring sporting events established in 1968
Recurring sporting events disestablished in 1969
1968 in Brazilian football
1969 in Brazilian football
Defunct football competitions in Brazil